Tamar Novas Pita (born 3 October 1986) is a Spanish actor.

Biography 
Tamar Novas Pita was born in Santiago de Compostela, Galicia, on 3 October 1986. He was cast for a minor role in José Luis Cuerda's Butterfly's Tongue in his early 10s, thus making his film debut. Likewise, he had his debut in a television series with a performance in the Galician A vida por diante. At age 16, he was cast as Ramón Sampedro's nephew in Alejandro Amenábar's The Sea Inside, a performance for which he won the Goya Award for Best New Actor. He also performed a blind screenwriter's guide in Broken Embraces. He has since featured in television series such as Acusados, Bandolera, Carlos, rey emperador or Cocaine Coast.

Filmography 

Film

Television

Accolades 

|-
| rowspan = "2" align = "center" | 2005 || 19th Goya Awards || Best New Actor || rowspan = "2" | The Sea Inside ||  || align = "center" | 
|-
| 14th Actors and Actresses Union Awards || Best New Actor ||  || align = "center" | 
|-
| align = "center" | 2021 || 19th Mestre Mateo Awards || Best Supporting Actor || The Mess You Leave Behind ||  || align = "center" | 
|}

References 
Informational notes

Citations

21st-century Spanish male actors
Spanish male television actors
Spanish male film actors
Spanish male stage actors
Male actors from Galicia (Spain)
1986 births
Living people